Shahrak-e Enqelab (also Romanized as  Shahrak-e Enqelāb; also known as Ghal‘eh Abdolshah, Qal‘eh ‘Abdos̄h Shāh, and Qal‘eh-ye ‘Abd osh Shāh) is a village in Shamsabad Rural District, in the Central District of Dezful County, Khuzestan Province, Iran. At the 2006 census, its population was 2,515, in 493 families.

References 

Populated places in Dezful County